Gustavo Guglielmone (born 16 May 1971) is an Argentine former cyclist. He competed in the team pursuit at the 1992 Summer Olympics.
He also won Vuelta del Este in 1992. Mendoza, Argentina:

References
https://sprintfinalarg.wixsite.com/recuerdos/post/vuelta-del-este-mendocino-1992-gano-gustavo-guglielmone
https://olympics.com/es/atletas/gustavo-alberto-guglielmone

External links 
 

1971 births
Living people
Argentine male cyclists
Olympic cyclists of Argentina
Cyclists at the 1992 Summer Olympics
Place of birth missing (living people)
Pan American Games medalists in cycling
Pan American Games bronze medalists for Argentina
Medalists at the 1991 Pan American Games
20th-century Argentine people